John of Neumarkt also Johannes von Neumarkt (1310 in Neumarkt – 24 December 1380 in Modřice, Moravia) was Chancellor of Emperor Charles IV, appointed Bishop of Naumburg, Bishop of Litomyšl, Bishop of Olomouc and elected Bishop of Wroclaw. He was also known by his humanistic works.

Life 
His bourgeois parents were Nicholas and Margaret. His brother Mathias was a Cistercian monk and Auxiliary Bishop of Litomyšl and later of Wroclaw. An older sister was married to Rudolf Richter in Vysoké Mýto. Their son 1394 was Dean of the Charles University.

John studied probably in Italy. Its promoters were Nikolaus von Pannwitz, curator of the Wrocław Cathedral Chapter, and Wolfram von Pannwitz, Viscount of Glatz. For 1340 John is as a notary of Ziębice Duke Bolko II. Proved. Presumably as a sinecure he received the parish Neumarkt, which he was allowed to keep with the permission of the Wroclaw Bishop Preczlaw of Pogarell even after he entered the service of the Bohemian Royal Chancery 1347th 1350 he received a canonry in Olomouc and in 1351 those in Breslau and Großglogau.

Appointed bishop of Naumburg 
1352 chose the Limburg cathedral chapter without the consent of Pope Clement VI. Rudolf von Nebra the new bishop. The pope responded with the appointment of John and was applicable as of the Bishop of Litomyšl, he led the Franciscans Burchard Graf von Mansfeld as a rival candidate to Rudolf von Nebra. The conflict in Naumburg lasted until 1358 and was investigated by the Cardinal Guy de Boulogne.

Bishop of Litomyšl 
On 9 October 1353 John was appointed bishop of Litomyšl. The ordination took place early 1354. He mostly stayed as court chancellor of Emperor Charles IV. In Prague, he was represented in Litomyšl by the Official Nikolaus of Pelhřimov and by his brother Mathias, who served there as auxiliary bishop. At his own expense Johannes was in Leitomischl an Augustinian monastery building.

Bishop of Olomouc 
With the support of Charles IV. John of Neumarkt was appointed on 28 August 1364 by Pope Urban V. Bishop of Olomouc, as the existing incumbents Jan Očko of Vlašim had risen to the Archbishop of Prague. A year later he received the title regalis capellae Bohemiae comes ("Count of the Bohemian royal chapel"), the honor and the right were connected, in the presence of other bishops - to crown the King of Bohemia and his on other occasions - with the exception of the archbishop of Prague put on the crown.

Also in Olomouc, John held only rarely and was represented by vicars general. There were the Brno Provost Nikolaus, Friedrich von Wolfram churches and the Olomouc Provost Jakob von Kaplitz. In 1367 John confirmed the statutes of the chapter of Kroměříž and in 1371 the establishment of the Augustinian monastery in Šternberk by his friend Albrecht of Sternberg. Only after John was like the emperor in 1373 from grace, he resided in his diocese, where he stayed for his part to comply with the residence obligation of the clergy. In 1380 he held synod in Kroměříž where he ordered the celebration of the feast of Saints Cyril and Methodius and the Saints Christina and Cordula. Because of a financial dispute occurred after the death of Emperor Charles between John and the Moravian Margrave Jobst and Prokop clashes, were forced to leave as a consequence of 1378 John and his chapter Olomouc. The conflict could only be resolved in 1380 by the Prague archbishop Jan of Jenštejn.

Elected bishop of Wroclaw 
Well because of Olomouc disputes aimed Johannes 1380 to a change of Olomouc in his home diocese Breslau. Even after the death of the Wroclaw Bishop Preczlaw of Pogarell (1376) John of Neumarkt was the preferred candidate of the Emperor Charles IV and Pope Gregory XI. Nevertheless, cathedral chapter chose the dean Dietrich of Klatovy, who was in 1378 confirmed in this office by the Avignon Pope Clement VII. In a repeat ballot in 1380 John of Neumarkt was elected as the Bishop of Breslau, but died before the papal confirmation would have reached him.

In imperial service 
Johannes von Neumarkt held the office of a notary at the Bohemian King John of Luxembourg and is since 1351 detectable as chancellor of the Bohemian queen Anna. 1352 he was appointed prothonotary and, succeeding Jan Očko of Vlašim as chancellor of Emperor Charles IV. In this position he was in February 1354 in Metz and in the autumn in France. 1355 he accompanied Charles IV. For imperial coronation in Rome and traveled to Nuremberg Christmas, where he participated in the Reichstag and was at the court day at the announcement of the Golden Bull in attendance on 10 January 1356. he was late 1356 again in Metz, 1357 in Aachen and in Vienna, in 1359 in Wroclaw. 1364 he took part in the negotiations between the Emperor Charles IV. and the Habsburgs.

In 1373 John lost the favor of the Emperor  nd lost the chancellorship. After his release he went to his diocese of Olomouc. Citing twenty-six years of loyal service he tried in vain to regain his former position.

Humanist and writer 

John of Neumarkt had an excellent education. He was an early proponent of the Bohemian humanism. In his surroundings, the first circle of humanists of the north of the Alps was cultivated. Since 1350 he knew Cola di Rienzo and, since 1354 Francesco Petrarca, with whom he corresponded extensively.

Because of his literary career he worked with several writers in his cities of Mürau, Kremsier and Mödritz. In the imperial chancery, he introduced a new instrument style, were used in the quotations from Latin classics and of the Church Fathers. He wrote formularies in the best Latin and sample collections for letters, documents and other documents and translated himself the "Soliloquia" into German. End of the 1350s years he made his journey breviary "Liber viaticus", which was illustrated by the so-called Master of the Liber viaticus. These illustrations are among the best of that time. Also German and Latin poems and prayers have received from him. Already in 1356 he bequeathed his books bequeathed to the Augustinian monastery of St. Thomas in Prague.

John maintained an orchestra, for secular celebrations designed, and strove for good education in schools. He put great care on the liturgy, which he unified in 1376 for the entire diocese.

John of Neumarkt was long regarded as identical with John of Hohenmauth. Recent research, however, assume two different persons.

Works 
 Cancellaria Joannis Noviforensis episcopi Olomucensis
 Summa cancellariae Caroli IV.
 Collectarius perpetuarum formarum
 Rubrica ecclesiae Olomucensis iuxta consuetudinem antiquam
 Buch der Liebkosung
 Das Leben des heiligen Hieronymus

Literature 
 
 
 Jan Bistřický: Johann von Neumarkt (um 1310–1380). In: Erwin Gatz: Die Bischöfe des Heiligen Römischen Reiches 1198 bis 1448., S. 512–513

References

External links 

 
 Johannes von Neumarkt im Repertorium "Geschichtsquellen des deutschen Mittelalters"
 Germania Sacra online
 Johannes von Neumarkt in der Ostdeutschen Biographie (Kulturportal West-Ost)
 

 

1380 deaths
14th-century writers
14th-century Roman Catholic bishops in Poland
14th-century German Roman Catholic bishops
Roman Catholic bishops of Naumburg
Bishops of Olomouc
1310 births
14th-century German writers
14th-century Latin writers